Andrzej Cichocki is a Polish computer scientist and professor at several Universities.  He is known for his work in blind signal and image processing, tensor factorisations, neural networks, and machine learning.  He is the author of several books.

Education  

Cichocki received a Ph.D from the Warsaw University of Technology in 1976 and a Habilitation in 1982 also from the Warsaw University of Technology.

Awards and honours  

Cichocki is listed among Clarivate's Highly Cited Researchers.

Andrzej Cichocki was named Fellow of the Institute of Electrical and Electronics Engineers (IEEE) in 2013 for contributions to applications of blind signal processing and artificial neural networks.

References

External links
 

Fellow Members of the IEEE
Living people
Year of birth missing (living people)